Termessadou-Dibo  is a town and sub-prefecture in the Guéckédou Prefecture in the Nzérékoré Region of south-western Guinea, near the borders of Sierra Leone and Liberia.

References

Sub-prefectures of the Nzérékoré Region